The Men's 1500 metres event  at the 2011 European Athletics Indoor Championships was held on March 5–6 with the final being held on March 6 at 16:20 local time.

Records

Results

Heats
First 2 in each heat and 3 best performers advance to the Final.

Final 
The final was held at 16:20.

References 

1500 metres at the European Athletics Indoor Championships
2011 European Athletics Indoor Championships